Kijani is a village in the Gračac municipality in Croatia.

History
At least 14 Serb civilians were killed by the Croatian Army in the village during and in the aftermath of Operation Storm in August 1995.

Population

According to the 2011 census, Kijani had 56 inhabitants.

Napomena: In census period 1857–1880 it include data for the settlement of Gubavčevo Polje and part of data for the settlement of Glogovo.

1991 census

According to the 1991 census, settlement of Kijani had 222 inhabitants, which were ethnically declared as this:

Austro-hungarian 1910 census

According to the 1910 census, settlement of Kijani had 580 inhabitants, which were linguistically and religiously declared as this:

Literature 

  Savezni zavod za statistiku i evidenciju FNRJ i SFRJ, popis stanovništva 1948, 1953, 1961, 1971, 1981. i 1991. godine.
 Knjiga: "Narodnosni i vjerski sastav stanovništva Hrvatske, 1880–1991: po naseljima, author: Jakov Gelo, izdavač: Državni zavod za statistiku Republike Hrvatske, 1998., ;

References

External links

Populated places in Zadar County
Lika